Uropeltis maculata, also known commonly as the spotted earth snake and the spotted shieldtail, is a species of nonvenomous snake in the family Uropeltidae. The species is endemic to southern India. There are no subspecies that are recognized as being valid.

Geographic range
U. maculata is found in southern India in the Western Ghats: Anaimalai Hills and southern Kerala.

No type locality was given in the original description. Beddome (1886) gives "Anaimalai, higher ranges  elevation.

Habitat
The preferred natural habitats of U. maculata are forest and grassland, but it has also been found in agricultural plantations.

Description
U. maculata is dark brown or black both dorsally and ventrally, with several deep red blotches on the sides anteriorly, rarely along the full length of the body. It has similar deep red blotches about the tail.

Adults may attain a total length (including tail) of 38 cm (15 inches).

The dorsal scales are arranged in 17 rows at midbody (in 19 rows behind the head). The ventrals number 152–173, and the subcaudals number 8-13.

The snout is obtuse. The rostral is about  the length of the shielded part of the head. The portion of the rostral visible from above is as long as its distance from the frontal. The nasals are in contact with each other behind the rostral. The frontal is longer than broad. The eye is small, its diameter less than  the length of the ocular shield. The diameter of the body goes 27 to 40 times into the total length. The tail is rounded or slightly laterally compressed. The caudal dorsal scales are smooth, or a few of the terminal ones are faintly keeled. The terminal scute is very small, with two points.

Reproduction
U. maculata is ovoviviparous.

References

Further reading

Beddome, R.H. (1878). "Descriptions of new Uropeltidæ from Southern India, with Remarks on some previously-described Species". Proceedings of the Zoological Society of London 1878 (1): 154–155. (Silybura maculata, new species, pp. 154–155).
Beddome, R.H. (1886). "An Account of the Earth-Snakes of the Peninsula of India and Ceylon". Annals and Magazine of Natural History, Fifth Series 17: 3–33. (Silybura maculata, p. 22).
Boulenger, G.A. (1890). The Fauna of British India, Including Ceylon and Burma. Reptilia and Batrachia. London: Secretary of State for India in Council. (Taylor and Francis, printers). xviii + 541 pp. (Silybura maculata, pp. 261–262).
Sharma, R.C. (2003). Handbook: Indian Snakes. Kolkata: Zoological Survey of India. 292 pp. .
Smith, M.A. (1943). The Fauna of British India, Ceylon and Burma, Including the Whole of the Indo-Chinese Sub-region. Reptilia and Amphibia. Vol. III.—Serpentes. London: Secretary of State for India. (Taylor and Francis, printers). xii + 583 pp. (Uropeltis maculatus, new combination, pp. 83–84).

Uropeltidae
Reptiles of India
Endemic fauna of the Western Ghats
Reptiles described in 1878
Taxa named by Richard Henry Beddome